Vyacheslav Vladimirovich Bakharev (born 22 March 1973 in Sverdlovsk) is a former Russian football player.

References

1973 births
Sportspeople from Yekaterinburg
Living people
Soviet footballers
Russian footballers
FC Ural Yekaterinburg players
Russian Premier League players
FC Chornomorets Odesa players
Russian expatriate footballers
Expatriate footballers in Ukraine
Ukrainian Premier League players
Association football midfielders
FC Torpedo Miass players
FC Nosta Novotroitsk players